Baekbaekgyo(백백교) was a Korean new religious movement founded by Woo Kwang Hyun that was related to the 1930s murder incident in Korea during the Japanese colonial period.

History
The movement first started as an offshoot of the religion Baekdokyo, an offshoot of Cheondoism.Baekdokyo(백도교,白道敎) was founded in 1899, with its official organization in 1912 and was led by leader Jeon jeong ye,an individual who claims to have received a revelation on the Kumgang Mountains.This Baekdogyo despite its prosetylyzation projects was mostly run as a secret organization and amassed 10,000 followers.After Jeon, the leader, was dead in 1919, Jeon's second son Yonghae and Wookwang hyun(a high priest of the religion at the time) secretly buried the body without telling the believers of the religion to prevent believers from leaving. A police investigation regarding the religion surrounding the case of victims of the religion led to the reveal of the secret burial, and Baekdogyo began to decline, and Leehuiryong another high staff of the religion decided to make its own branch called Incheondo(人天道) in 1923.This led to Woo taking the remaining sect of the Baekdogyo and relaunch the religion as Baekbaekgyo in 1923.

Beliefs and practices
The movement believed in an apocalyptic theology and that chanting the mantras of Baekbaekbaekuiuiuijeokjeokjeokgameunggamgameunghasiopsungseong(백백백의의의적적적감응감감응하시옵숭성,白白白衣衣衣赤赤赤感應感感應하시옵崇誠) would lead to  a long diseaseless life.The movement requested its believers to dedicate their wealth to the religion, and send their daughters as servants for the founder.

Murder incident and Decline
Through a police investigation 800 remains of dead people were found  in Kangwon and Gyeonggi province in 1937,which were people who were murdered when they tried to go against the commands of the religious founder.All of the high staff of the religion  was prosecuted for murder

Adaptation
The incident was made into a movie  with the same name in 1961 BaekBaekgyo and 1992 Baekbaekgyo.

References

Korean new religions